The Saint Kitts & Nevis Amateur Athletic Association (SKNAAA) is the governing body for the sport of athletics in Saint Kitts and Nevis.

History
SKNAAA was founded in 1961. After separating from the Saint Kitts Amateur Athletic and Cycling
Association in 1977, SKNAAA was affiliated to the IAAF in 1978.

Current president is Glenville Jeffers.  He was elected in December 2009 and re-elected in January 2014.

Affiliations
SKNAAA is the national member federation for Saint Kitts and Nevis in the following international organisations:
International Association of Athletics Federations (IAAF)
North American, Central American and Caribbean Athletic Association (NACAC)
Association of Panamerican Athletics (APA)
Central American and Caribbean Athletic Confederation (CACAC)
Leeward Islands Athletic Association (LIAA)†
†: The Nevis Amateur Athletic Association (NAAA) is separately affiliated to the LIAA.

Moreover, it is part of the following national organisations:
Saint Kitts and Nevis Olympic Committee (SKNOC)

National records
SKNAAA maintains the Saint Kitts and Nevis records in athletics.

External links
Official website
SKNAAA on facebook

References

National members of the North American, Central American and Caribbean Athletic Association
Amateur Athletic Association
National governing bodies for athletics
Sports organizations established in 1961
Sports associations
1961 establishments in Saint Kitts and Nevis